The Roof of the World is a Big Finish Productions audio drama based on the long-running British science fiction television series Doctor Who.

Plot
The Doctor and friends arrive in Tibet, 1917 and investigate an ancient evil hidden in the Himalayas.

Cast
The Doctor — Peter Davison
Peri Brown — Nicola Bryant
Erimem — Caroline Morris
Lord Mortimer Davey — Edward de Souza
Pharaoh Amenhotep II — William Franklyn
General Alexander Bruce — Sylvester Morand
John Matthews — Alan Cox

Notes
"The Roof of the World" was the title of the first episode of First Doctor serial Marco Polo. It has occasionally been applied to the entire story as well, following its use in the Radio Times Tenth Anniversary Special.

External links
Big Finish Productions – The Roof of the World

2004 audio plays
Fifth Doctor audio plays
Fiction set in 1917